Mihály Barla Slovene Miháo Barla (circa 1778 – February 4, 1824) was a Slovenian Lutheran pastor, writer, and poet.

He was born in Murska Sobota. He studied in Sopron, in the Evangelical Lyceum, by 1803 studied in the University of Jena.
In 1807 was the director of the Hungarian-Latin School of Sárszentlőrinc (Tolna), in 1808 teacher of Evangelical School of Győr. 1810-1824 ministrat in Kővágóörs, near the Balaton, and here died.

Other works
  (Sopron, 1901)
  (Sopron, 1820)
  (Győr, ?)

See also

 List of Slovene writers and poets in Hungary
 Mihály Bakos
 Kővágóörs

References
 Petőfi Sándor - Sárszentlőrinci gyökerek
 Történelmi arcképcsarnok - Vas megye
 Anton Trstenjak: Slovenci na Ogrskem, Narodopisna in književna črtica, Objava Arhivskih Virov, Maribor 2006.

1770s births
1824 deaths
People from Murska Sobota
Slovenian Lutheran clergy
Slovenian writers and poets in Hungary
Hungarian male poets
19th-century Hungarian poets
19th-century Hungarian male writers